Loricaster is a genus of minute beetles in the family Clambidae. There are at least three described species in Loricaster.

Species
These three species belong to the genus Loricaster:
 Loricaster cribripennis Reitter, 1904
 Loricaster rotundus Grigarick & Schuster, 1961
 Loricaster testaceus Mulsant & Rey, 1861

References

Further reading

 
 

Scirtoidea
Articles created by Qbugbot